Statistics of the México Primera División for the 1968–69 season.

Overview

Laguna was promoted to Primera División.

The season was contested by 16 teams, and Cruz Azul won the championship. The season was suspended from September 16 to November 8 for the celebration of the 1968 Summer Olympic Games in Mexico City.

Nuevo León was relegated to Segunda División

Teams

League standings

Results

Relegation Playoff 

Aggregate tied. Replay will take place.

Aggregate tied. Replay will take place.

Oro won 4-3 on aggregate. Nuevo León is relegated to Segunda Division.

Notes

References
Mexico - List of final tables (RSSSF)

Mex
1968–69 in Mexican football
1968-69